Jay Tregonning (born 13 February 1978) is an Australian rugby union coach. He is currently the Head Coach of the Australian women's national rugby union team.

Tregonning was the Wallaroos assistant coach at the 2014 Rugby World Cup in France. He has served as an Assistant Coach in the Australian Schools and the Under 18's program. He was part of the coaching staff of the Australian Schoolboys team that beat the New Zealand Schoolboys and broke a seven-year losing streak in 2019.

Tregonning was appointed as the Wallaroos Head Coach in September 2021 following the resignation of Dwayne Nestor. He coached the Wallaroos at the 2021 Rugby World Cup in New Zealand where they reached the quarter-final.

References 

Living people
Australian rugby union coaches
1978 births